Going Bananas is a 1987 American comedy film directed by Boaz Davidson and written by Menahem Golan. The film stars Dom DeLuise, Jimmie Walker, David Mendenhall, Deep Roy, Warren Berlinger and Herbert Lom. The film was released on February 12, 1988, by Cannon Film Distributors.

Plot
A boy (David Mendenhall), his guardian (Dom DeLuise) and an African guide (Jimmie Walker) try to save a talking chimp called Bonzo from bad guys.

Cast 
Dom DeLuise as Big Bad Joe Hopkins
Jimmie Walker as Mozambo 
David Mendenhall as Ben McNamara
Deep Roy as Bonzo
Warren Berlinger as Palermo
Herbert Lom as Captain Mackintosh
Fats Dibeco as Sergeant Abdul
Graham Armitage as Cake Waiter
Mike Westcott as Robert Anderson

Production 
The role of Big Bad Joe Hopkins was advertised to be played by Bud Spencer before changed to Dom DeLuise. Directors considered were Menahem Golan and Sam Firstenberg.

References

External links
 
 

1987 films
American comedy films
1987 comedy films
Films scored by Pino Donaggio
Films about apes
Films directed by Boaz Davidson
Films set in Africa
Films shot in Kenya
Films shot in South Africa
Films shot in Zimbabwe
Golan-Globus films
Films produced by Menahem Golan
Films with screenplays by Menahem Golan
Films produced by Yoram Globus
1980s English-language films
1980s American films